Amr is an Arabic male name.

Etymology
It is most commonly written as "Amr", but is also written as "Amro". The word is derived from the tri-literal Arabic root meaning "to live a long time."

When the Arabic letter wāw is added to the end of the Arabic name Umar, the name changes to "Amr". Although very close in writing in Arabic, they are two different names, though sometimes the one is transliterated as the other, so ʿAmr ibn al-ʿAs is sometimes transliterated as "Omar ibn al-Aas". In the same way, it is possible to find Omar ibn al-Khattab transliterated as "Amr ibn al-Khattab". The transcription of "Amr" as "Amro" or "Amru" is another way to differentiate it from the name "Omar"

The most prominent person in Islam named  ʿAmr was ʿAmr ibn al-ʿAs.

People
Amr ibn Abd al-Wud (died 627), champion of Quraish
Amr ibn al-Layth (died 902), ruler of the Saffarid dynasty of Iran
Amr ibn Hisham (died 624), Meccan leader (Muhammad called him Abu Jahl)
Amr ibn Jarmouz, (fl. 656), killer of Talha
Amr ibn Khalid (died 680), one of the Companions of Husayn ibn Ali
Amr ibn Kulthum (died 584), leader of the Taghlab tribe
Amr ibn Maymun, one of the Ansar companions of Muhammad
Amr ibn Ubayd (died 761), Mu'tazili leader
Amr Adel (born 1980), Egyptian footballer
Amr Darrag (born 1958), Egyptian engineer and politician
Amr Diab (born 1961), Egyptian musician
Amr El Halwani (born 1985), Egyptian footballer
Amr El-Safty (born 1982), Egyptian footballer
Amr Fahim (born 1976), Egyptian footballer
Amr Ghoneim, Egyptian tennis player
Amr Hamed (died 1998), Canadian killed by US bombing in Afghanistan
Amr Hamzawy (born 1968), Egyptian political scientist
Amr Khaled (born 1967), Egyptian activist and preacher
Amr Mostafa (born 1979) Egyptian singer
Amr Moussa (born 1936), secretary-general of the League of Arab States
Amr Salem (born 1958), Syrian politician
Amr Samaka (born 1983), Egyptian footballer
Amr Shabana (born 1979), Egyptian squash player
Amr Sobhy (born 1988), Egyptian information activist, author and poet
Amr El Solia (born 1990), Egyptian footballer
Amr Waked (born 1973), Egyptian actor
Amr Warda (born 1993) , Egyptian footballer 
Amr Zaki (born 1983), Egyptian footballer

Surname
F. D. Amr Bey (1910- ?), Egyptian diplomat and squash player
Mohamed Kamel Amr (born 1942), Egyptian diplomat
Nabil Amr (born 1947), Palestinian politician

Variants
Amr ibn al-As (–664), military commander, led Muslim conquest of Egypt in 640
Amr ibn Uthman, one of the Tabi'un and son of Uthman
Amro Jenyat (born 1993), Syrian footballer
Amer el-Maati (born 1963), Canadian accused of terrorism

Other uses
Amr (or Amhar), a son of legendary King Arthur
Banu Amr — a tribe
 Prince Amr Ibrahim Palace, a palace in Egypt

Arabic-language surnames
Arabic masculine given names